The Lashari is a baloch tribe. According to baloch folklore the tribe was founded by Lashar Khan, one of Mir Jalal Khan's four sons. Lasharis led by Mir Gwahram Khan Lashari, are believed to have engaged in a 30-year war against the Rind, in which both tribes suffered greatly. These events are the subject of many baloch heroic ballads.

Lashari is a major-caste of the Baloch community living in Sindh and Balochistan.

References

Jat clans
Sindhi tribes
Baloch tribes
Ethnic groups in Pakistan
Social groups of Pakistan